Perkin may refer to:

People
 Perkin (surname)
 Perkin Warbeck (c. 1474 – 1499), imposter and pretender to the English throne

Other uses
 Perkin (crater), on the Moon
 2482 Perkin, asteroid
 Perkin Medal, awarded annually by the American section of the Society of Chemical Industry
 a character in The Flumps

See also
 Perkins (disambiguation)
 Parkin (disambiguation)
 PerkinElmer, an American-origin global corporation